"Baby Baby" is a pop song by American recording artist Amy Grant and it was issued as the first single from her eighth studio album, Heart in Motion (1991). The song was written by Keith Thomas and Grant.  It was released on January 18, 1991, through A&M Records and topped the US Billboard Hot 100 chart for two consecutive weeks in April 1991, becoming the first in a string of hits from Heart in Motion. At the 34th Annual Grammy Awards in 1992, the song received three Grammy Award nominations, including Song of the Year and Record of the Year.

Background 

The music was written by Keith Thomas. Grant always knew the song would be a smash hit, and was begging Thomas to write the song. He agreed with the only condition that the song's title must be "Baby Baby". Grant had a hard time writing the lyrics, because her early attempts to write a romantic-sounding lyric to a song with such title came off sounding like "some overgrown football jock with no vocabulary trying desperately to be romantic". But one day, after having seen her six-week-old daughter Millie, she said to herself: "Oh, baby baby". As a result, the lyrics were written in about ten minutes in her kitchen. In the Heart in Motion booklet are the words: This song is dedicated to Millie, whose six-week-old face was my inspiration. Millie would also appear on stage during Grant's performance at the 34th Grammy Awards.

Composition 

The song is almost four minutes in length and is composed in the key of F-sharp major, set in the time signature of  common time with a moderate tempo of 98 beats per minute. In the middle of the song, the key is changed to A-flat major, then for a short amount of time goes back to F major and finally ends with A major. Grant's vocal range spans from F3 to D♯5.

The song consists of three verses that are interrupted by a bridge, "'Stop for a minute, baby I'm so glad you're mine". Lyrically, the song praises that special someone and expresses love that started since the day her heart was "put in motion". The chorus is the source of the album's title: "And ever since the day you put my heart in motion, baby I realized that there's just no gettin' over you". It fades out with the lyrics:

Critical reception 
Pan-European magazine Music & Media wrote, "New single from the lady who brought us the 1988 hit single Lead Me On, which is also featured on this. She still sounds grand on this danceable pop tune." In their review of the Heart in Motion album, they complimented it as "heavenly".

Chart performance 

"Baby Baby" was Amy Grant's biggest hit since her 1986 duet with Peter Cetera, "The Next Time I Fall". In the United States, "Baby Baby" became Grant's second number-one hit on the pop charts and her first as a solo artist, topping the Billboard Hot 100 (replacing Wilson Phillips' "You're in Love" from the top spot) and Adult Contemporary charts for two and three weeks, respectively. It also made Grant the first Christian pop singer to have a number-one single in the United States. The single reached the Top Ten in ten countries, in addition to reaching No. 11 in Switzerland. In the United Kingdom, "Baby Baby" was the singer's first (and only) Top Five hit in that country, reaching No. 2 in the UK Singles Chart. "Baby Baby" went on to become Grant's biggest hit single and one of the most successful singles of 1991.

Music video

Development and release 

The accompanying music video for "Baby Baby" was directed by D.J. Webster. and edited by Scott C. Wilson.
According to Webster, the video's main idea was to create a picture of the relationship that everybody wants. Grant added, "I think when you get film where there is a good sense of humor and mutual respect and people are just having a good time, everybody wants a piece of that". Its beginning features Grant receiving attention from other men, and her staying loyal to her lover, portrayed by model Jme Stein (who also appeared in her other video from that album "Good for Me"). At some point Stein is seen singing along with Grant and at the end lip-syncing to the words "Baby I'm so glad". The rest of the video is all about the couple having fun together.

Release and reception 

The video first aired in March 1991, although MTV didn't air it until it had become too popular not to. A music critic J.D. Considine praised the video, writing that "the Baby Baby clip defines the way most of us imagine her. It was hardly typical video fare, with no special effects or distant locales; all it offered was Grant and a good-looking guy cavorting and acting pretty as she lip-synced to the song. Yet there was something genuinely appealing about the image it conveyed, something that made viewers want to see the thing again". It received a nomination for Best Female Video at the 1991 MTV Video Music Awards, but lost to Janet Jackson's "Love Will Never Do".

It's available on the 1992 music video tape The Heart in Motion Video Collection and 2004 music video DVD Greatest Videos 1986-2004. A live performance is available on the 2006 DVD Time Again… Amy Grant Live.

Track listings 

 US retail 7-inch single and US retail cassette single
 "Baby Baby" (LP version) - 3:56
 "Baby Baby" (7-inch Heart in Motion mix) – 3:50

 US retail CD single
 "Baby Baby" (7-inch Heart in Motion mix) – 3:50
 "Baby Baby" (12-inch Heart in Motion mix) – 6:02
 "Lead Me On" (LP version) – 5:36

 International 7-inch single and Australian CD single
 "Baby Baby" (7-inch No Getting over You mix) – 4:01
 "Lead Me On" – 5:36

 UK retail CD single
 "Baby Baby" (7-inch No Getting over You mix) – 4:01
 "Baby Baby" (12-inch Heart in Motion mix) – 6:01
 "Lead Me On" – 5:36

 Dave Audé Remixes digital single (2014)
 "Baby Baby" (featuring Dave Audé) [radio edit] - 3:59
 "Baby Baby" (featuring Dave Audé) [extended mix] - 5:23
 "Baby Baby" (featuring Dave Audé) [dub] - 4:55

Credits and personnel 

Credits areadapted from the Heart in Motion booklet.

 Amy Grant – lead vocals
 Keith Thomas – synthesizers, bass, drum programming
 Brian Tankersley – additional synthesizer programming
 Jerry McPherson – guitars
 VickI Hampton – backing vocals
 Ron Hemby – backing vocals
 Donna McElroy – backing vocals

Production
 Keith Thomas – producer, arrangements 
 Todd Moore – production assistant, assistant engineer 
 Bill Whittington – recording engineer 
 Todd Culross – assistant engineer
 Kelly Pribble – assistant engineer
 Brian Malouf – mixing
 Pat MacDougal – mix assistant
 Daniel Abraham – additional production and remix ("Heart in Motion" 7-inch and 12-inch mixes, "No Getting over You" 7-inch and 12-inch mixes)

Charts

Weekly charts

Year-end charts

Certifications

Release history

Legacy 

The song received three Grammy nominations for Best Female Pop Vocal Performance and Song of the Year, but lost in both categories to Bonnie Raitt's "Something to Talk About" and Natalie Cole's "Unforgettable", respectively.

Grant appeared on Monday Night Football in a promotional music video for "Baby Baby" that featured new lyrics custom-made for the night's game. "Baby Baby" was covered by The Swirling Eddies on the 1996 album Sacred Cows. It was covered by Alana D on the Mr. & Mrs. Smith soundtrack. It is also featured in the 2004 film Harold & Kumar Go to White Castle. It was also briefly referenced in the 30 Rock episode "Queen of Jordan" where it was derided as "white nonsense". The song is referenced in Grant's 1997 Got Milk? ad. The song is heard in the Only Fools and Horses episode "Miami Twice" when Del Boy and Rodney arrive in the night club they go to in Miami.

Grant recorded an updated version of the song with pop artist Tori Kelly. Released on April 29, 2016, it commemorates the song's 25th anniversary.

References 

Amy Grant songs
1991 singles
Billboard Hot 100 number-one singles
Cashbox number-one singles
Songs written by Amy Grant
Songs written by Keith Thomas (record producer)
1991 songs
A&M Records singles
Song recordings produced by Keith Thomas (record producer)